Junagarh is a town and a notified area council in Kalahandi district in the Indian state of Odisha. MLA of Junagarh is Captain Divya Shankar Mishra. It was the capital of the former state of Kalahandi. Junagarh is 26 km from Bhawanipatna, connecting National Highway 201.This highway recently has been termed as National Highway 26.

Junagarh was a well-built fort and capital of Kalahandi during king rule. The fortified area has a number of temples with Odia inscriptions. This is a place which has sculptural evidence of the sati rite, which was prevalent in medieval India, and was stopped during the British Raj by Lord William Bentinck. The sculptures are identified as sati pillars
Junagarh was famous for its ponds and fruit garden"chha kodi bandha naa kodi tota", means 120 ponds and 180 orchard. Junagarh is also famous for its temples. It is also known as temple city of Kalahandi.

Demographics
Junagarh city is divided into 12 wards.
 India census, Junagarh had a population of 15,759. Males constitute 51% of the population and females 49%. Junagarh has an average literacy rate of 55%, lower than the national average of 59.5%: male literacy is 66%, and female literacy is 44%. In Junagarh, 14% of the population is under 6 years of age.

Areas In Junagarh
Talbandh Para
Aam gachh para
Babu para
Bad para
Bajar para
Bargachh para
Bramhin para
Chamra bandh Para
Dangaghat para
Dhoba Para
Fateh Nagar
Gantayat Para
Handa Khal Para
Hinjli baheli
Indra khunti Para
Laxmisagar Para
Madhyam Para
Marwadi Para
Samia bandh Para
Pragati Nagar Para
Kanya Ashram Para

Education

Schools
 Junagarh English school
 Junagarh Government High School
 Block Colony U.G.M.E. School
Jogeswar U.G.M.E School
 Lankeswari Government Girls High School
 Saraswati Sishu Vidya Mandir
 Government TRW Girls school
 Government TRW Boys school
 Guru Gita Smart School
 El Nissi Mission School
 Sri Aurobindo Integral Education Center
 Odisha Adarsh Vidyalaya
(S.A.I.E.C.)

Colleges
 Priyadarsini Indira mahavidyalaya

 Chameli Devi women's College
 Sardar Raja Medical College, Jaring
 Lambodara College of Science, Chichaiguda
 Sudhansu Sekhar (Junior) Mohavidyalaya, Karlakot
 Swami Chidananda (Junior) Mahavidyalaya, Karchala
 Chichaiguda (Junior) Mahavidyalaya, Chichaiguda

Temples

Ganesh Idols at Pandals

 Lankeswari Temple
 Shiva Temple
 Dadhi baman Temple
 Jagannath Temple
 Trinath Temple
 Sai Temple
 Gayatri Temple
 Kanak Durga Temple
 Poda Mahadev Temple
 Sriram Temple
 Sani dev Temple
 Loknath Temple

Festivals

Maa Lankeshwari is the principal deity of the Naga clan at Junagarh.
The deity is still revered by the king and his descendants.
The descendants of the king perform puja in the temple of Lankeshwari 
on the auspicious day of Mulashtami as KHANDABASA

‘Khandabasa’ festival was observed at Goddess Lankeswari temple at Junagarh 
with the congregation of a large numbers of devotees. After performing the traditional rituals, the swords of Goddess Lankeswari and Bhairav were placed on the two sides of the Goddess Lankeswari altar by a representative of the royal family in standing position over a heap of rice. Goddess Lankeswari is treated as a war Goddess as thus the significance of the practice of ‘Khandabasa’.  Tradition has it that during the rule of Chindakanaga, Ganga, Kalachuri and Naga dynasties the traditional sword of Goddess Lankeswari was worshipped to seek her blessings before going to a war.

Durga Puja and gajalaxmi puja are also important festivals.
Various pandals are constructed throughout the town.

Tourist place

Chuda pahad
Bhatra jor(jojna)kupagaon)
Palma jharan
Dokarichanchara
Nilakantheswar Temple, Chichaiguda

Ponds
 Lakshmi Sagar
 Siba Sagar
 Kastura Sagar
 Hira Sagar
 Dhoba Sagar
 Sunari Bandh
 Tal Bandh
 Atra Bandh
 Chamra Bandh
 Samia Bandh
 Rani Bandh

River
 Hatinadi

 Sagda

 Telnadi

Hospitals
A 50 bedded government hospital is present in the town. Recently a medical college [Sardar Raja Medical College and hospital] is being constructed near the town. The hospital has already been started a year ago. A multi specialty clinic named as Bharati health foundation is present near the block office which caters both Medical and Dental facilities.
Hospitals Nearby
 Community Health Center, Junagarh (ଗୋଷ୍ଠୀ ସ୍ୱାସ୍ଥ୍ୟ କେନ୍ଦ୍ର, ଜୁନାଗଡ)
 Eye Hospital, Junagarh (ନେତ୍ର ଚିକିତ୍ସାଳୟ, ଜୁନାଗଡ)

 Sub-Divisional Headquarters Hospital, Dharamgarh

Transport
A new railway station for Junagarh has been opened for service and was inaugurated on 2 March 2014.

Junagarh to Raipur
58208/Junagarh Road - Raipur Passenger

Junagarh to Bhubaneswar
18438/Junagarh Road - Bhubaneswar Express

Junagarh to Sambalpur
58304/Junagarh Road - Sambalpur Passenger

Politics
Current MLA from Junagarh Assembly Constituency is Dibya shankar mishra of BJD, who won the seat in State elections of 2014. Previous MLAs from this seat include Himansu Sekhar Meher who won this seat in 2004 and also in 2000 as BJP candidate, Late Bikram Keshari Deo who won this seat in 1995 and 1990 as BJP candidate and also in 1985 as JNP candidate, Maheswar Barad who won this representing INC(I) in 1980 and as INC candidate in 1977.

Junagarh is part of Kalahandi (Lok Sabha constituency).

References

Cities and towns in Kalahandi district